Botley railway station serves Botley and the surrounding areas in the English county of Hampshire.

Although named after the nearby village of Botley, which is within the boundaries of the Borough of Eastleigh, the station is actually located in the civil parish of Curdridge, which falls within the boundaries of the City of Winchester.

History

Botley station was first opened on 29 November 1841 by the London and South Western Railway (LSWR). However it closed again on 3 December that year, due to an earthslip, before reopening on 7 February 1842. Botley was once the junction for the Bishops Waltham branch which was opened in 1863 and finally closed to freight in 1962. Some of the track from the branch still exists as a long siding and is used by Aggregate Industries which operate an aggregate railhead depot and coated roadstone plant at Botley.

The station was a major loading point for strawberry traffic until about 1940, with trains taking the local produce up to London. The station possessed an extensive network of sidings and loading bays for this seasonal traffic and for storing the special ventilated vans that transported the fruit. The goods yard is now occupied by the Aggregate Industries stone plant. All traffic declined from 1950 onwards, but passenger numbers began to build again in the 1990s with the re-introduction of direct services to London for the first time since before the war. The line was electrified, on the 3rd rail system, in the 1990s. The station and route was again closed due to a land slip on 31 January 2014. The line reopened on 15 March 2014.

The station was refurbished in Summer 2015. New lighting, barriers and repainting took place. The platforms were also resurfaced.

Services
South Western Railway operate all off-peak services at Botley using  and  EMUs.

The typical off-peak service in trains per hour is:
 1 tph to  via 
 1 tph to 

During the weekday peak hours, the service is increased to 2 tph.

This service is operated using  and  DMUs.

References

External links

Railway stations in Hampshire
DfT Category F2 stations
Former London and South Western Railway stations
Railway stations in Great Britain opened in 1841
Railway stations served by South Western Railway
1841 establishments in England
Railway stations served by Great Western Railway